Illegal - Justice, Out of Order is an Indian legal thriller web series directed by Sahir Raza, starring Neha Sharma, Akshay Oberoi, Kubbra Sait, Piyush Mishra and Satyadeep Mishra. A courtroom drama where an idealistic lawyer finds herself trapped in the murky world of criminal law. The web series premiered on Voot on 12 May 2020.

Plot
The plot revolves around Niharika Singh who is a lawyer and is hired by a renowned law firm which is run by Janardhan Jaitley. Throughout the series, Niharika makes several shocking revelations. She is forced to work on other cases as supposed on the one she was hired for which revolved around rape and sexual harassment charges.

Cast
Neha Sharma as Niharika Singh 
Akshay Oberoi as Akshay Jaitley
Kubbra Sait as Maher Salam
Piyush Mishra as Janardhan Jaitley
Tanuj Virwani as Raghav (Season 2)
Satyadeep Mishra as Puneet Tandon
Nabeel Ahmed as Manav Mehta
Ankit Gupta as Neeraj
Deepak Tijori as Niharika's Father
Karmveer Choudhary as DCP Ravi Pandit
Kriti Vij as Sue
Parul Gulati as Devika, Devika Jaitley
Sonnalli Seygall as Simone Kalra
Naresh Gosain as Session Court Judge
Khushboo Atre as Female Constable 1

Release
The web series premiered on Voot on 12 May 2020.

Illegal - Justice, Out of Order Season 2 is live now on Voot. Released on 25 November 2021.

Critical reception 
Pallabi Dey Purkayastha from The Times Of India rated the series 3 out of 5 and overall praised the director for effectively maintaining the likeability factor of the script and its characters throughout the series but also added that the chaos and commotion is too hard to ignore at times. Jyoti Kanyal from India Today shared her critical review stating "Illegal has an appealing premise, but what goes against the show is the poor direction and writing".

Ruchi Kaushal from Hindustan Times highly praised the performance of the cast especially Neha Sharma and Kubbra Sait, and commended the director for creating such a tight knit legal drama without losing the reins of the plot or the thrill. Nandani Ramnath from Scroll.in

References 

2020 Indian television series debuts
Hindi-language web series
Psychological thriller web series
Indian drama web series